ESPN Saturday Night Football on ABC (branded for sponsorship purposes as ESPN Saturday Night Football on ABC presented by Capital One) is an American weekly presentation of prime time broadcasts of National Collegiate Athletic Association (NCAA) Division I Football Bowl Subdivision (FBS) college football games that are produced by ESPN, and televised on ABC. Games are presented each Saturday evening starting at 7:30 p.m. Eastern Time/6:30 p.m. Central Time during the college football regular season, which has been the case since 2017 (some weeks until 2015 saw no game on ABC, due to Saturday evening Sprint Cup Series NASCAR coverage or to avoid competition with the World Series; ESPN would then carry that week's high-profile game instead, with ESPN2 carrying a secondary game usually seen on ESPN/ABC). The ESPN on ABC Saturday Night Football coverage began in 2006, as both ESPN and ABC are owned by The Walt Disney Company. It is ESPN's biggest game of the week, and in most cases (outside where another networks carries the game), the city and/or campus of that night's game is where that day's ESPN College GameDay had originated.

, the primary broadcast team for half the games includes play-by-play announcer Chris Fowler and analyst Kirk Herbstreit, with Holly Rowe as sideline reporter. Kevin Negandhi, Booger McFarland, and Dan Mullen host the studio halftime show. Negandhi also provides in game updates throughout the game. Other ESPN broadcast teams may also occasionally appear for regional (and some national) telecasts.

Overview
Saturday Night Football premiered on September 2, 2006, with a game between the Notre Dame Fighting Irish and Georgia Tech Yellow Jackets. While ABC and ESPN have aired college football games on Saturday nights for decades, this program marks the first time that a collegiate sports broadcast has officially been part of any major broadcast television network's primetime schedule.

Twelve weeks of regular season games were televised during the three-month college football season in 2006, 2007 and from 2009 to 2011; the Dr. Pepper Big 12 Football Championship Game closing out each season until a conference realignment in which four university football programs left and two others joined the Big 12 Conference resulted in the Championship Game being discontinued after the 2010 event (the Big 12 Football Championship Game  returned in 2017, however, it did not return to ABC until 2018, when the network aired the game in the afternoon instead of in primetime). With the college football season being extended by one week, ABC televised thirteen weeks of games in 2008, closing with the 2008 Big 12 Championship Game on December 6. With the loss of the Sprint Cup Series to NBC and NBCSN, Saturday Night Football expanded its seasonal game schedule full-time to 13 weeks beginning in 2015, starting with the Advocare Classic.

Games from the Atlantic Coast Conference, the Big 12 Conference, the old Big East Conference, the Big Ten Conference, the Pac-12 Conference, the now-defunct Western Athletic Conference and the American Athletic Conference have aired on Saturday Night Football, as well as non-conference games in which teams from these conferences were either playing at home or a neutral-site game to which ABC holds the television rights.  All BCS/CFP and Power 5 conferences have appeared on Saturday Night Football, as the Southeastern Conference has had its teams featured in 21 non-conference games. Boise State, Utah State, BYU, 
Temple, UConn, UCF, Cincinnati, SMU, Tulsa, and Memphis are the only Group of 5 teams to be featured on "Saturday Night Football" to date, with the latter four teams being featured when they were members of the BCS-aligned Big East or American Athletic Conference.

In recent years, following the loss of some broadcast rights of the Pac-12 Conference to Fox Sports in 2012, the Pac-12's Saturday Night Football appearances have been limited to non-conference games, especially home games against Notre Dame and games against the Southeastern Conference, as well as road games against conferences that still have broadcast rights with ABC.

Besides Pac-12 and Big Ten games, ABC makes most of its game broadcast selections or options twelve days prior to the game (with some being made six days beforehand). This allows ABC to 'flex' the most compelling game it has the rights to broadcast into the Saturday Night Football slot. As a result, the Saturday night game is usually ABC's "game of the week". Beginning in 2024, ABC will have the option to feature an SEC game on Saturday Night Football for the first time.

As of the 2016 college football season, all games on ABC are broadcast in the 16:9 letterbox format on both the SD and HD feeds.

As ESPN has signed new contracts with various conferences to produce college football coverage, the network has begun branding its coverage of select conferences to which it has rights. This branding was first seen on SEC broadcasts in 2011, which became the "SEC on ESPN". ACC broadcasts followed suit in 2012 becoming the "ACC on ESPN". In 2018, the network started branding games aired on ABC as the "ACC on ABC", even though the ACC on ESPN logo is still used for replay wipes. Similarly, all Pac-12 games broadcast under the branding of "Pac-12 on ESPN" or as the "Pac-12 on ABC". In 2016, a new contract brought conference branding to Big Ten telecasts as well, which air on both ESPN and ABC. While Big Ten games that air on ESPN cable channels are branded as the "Big Ten on ESPN", games airing on ABC are now branded as the "Big Ten on ABC". While the program is still officially part of ESPN College Football which is reflected when talent appears on screen, the Big Ten on ABC logo and branding is used for intro, program IDs, and replay wipes.  Similarly, because of the new ESPN-Big 12 deal, games featuring teams from the Big 12 will appear on the network under the "Big 12 on ESPN" or "Big 12 on ABC" brand, with replay wipes having the Big 12 on ESPN brand logo. Similarly, with the American Conference, games with teams from the American will appear under the "American Conference on ESPN" or "American Conference on ABC" brand. This is the first time any regularly schedule sporting event outside of the National Spelling Bee has carried any ABC branding since 2006.

The Advocare Classic (formerly the Cowboys Classic) became the opening game for Saturday Night Football beginning in 2011; however in 2013, the matchup between the Georgia Bulldogs and Clemson Tigers served as the opening game with the Classic matchup between LSU and TCU being broadcast on ESPN. The Classic served as the opening game for Saturday Night Football again in 2014 (that year, involving the Florida State Seminoles and Oklahoma State Cowboys), in 2015 (Alabama Crimson Tide and Wisconsin Badgers) and in 2016 (Alabama Crimson Tide and USC Trojans).  In 2017, the Chick-fil-A Kickoff Game (between the top ranked Alabama Crimson Tide and the third ranked Florida State Seminoles; which was later described as the Greatest Opener of All Time) served as the opening game for Saturday Night Football (first time since 2010), while the Advocare Classic featuring the Michigan Wolverines and Florida Gators aired in the 3:30 ET timeslot. In 2018, the Camping World Kickoff (between the new look Louisville Cardinals and the defending 2017 national champion Alabama Crimson Tide) served as the Saturday Night Football season premiere. The Advocare Classic, between the 2017 ACC Runner-Up Miami Hurricanes and LSU Tigers, aired the next night in primetime, as it served as the Sunday Night Kickoff game presented by NHTSA. The Advocare Classic returned to Saturday Night Football in 2019, with the Oregon Ducks facing the Auburn Tigers, for the first time since the 2011 Tostitos BCS National Championship Game, in which Auburn won 27–21.

Broadcast teams

2006
Brent Musburger, play-by-play; Kirk Herbstreit and Bob Davie, analysts; and Lisa Salters, sideline reporter.
Ten games: Notre Dame–Georgia Tech, Ohio State–Texas, Nebraska–USC, Notre Dame–Michigan State, Ohio State–Iowa, Oregon–California, Michigan–Penn State, Oklahoma–Texas A&M, Wake Forest–Florida State, and Notre Dame–USC.
Dan Fouts, play-by-play; Tim Brant, analyst; and Jack Arute, sideline reporter.
Three games: USC–Arizona, Nebraska–Iowa State, and UCLA–California.
Mark Jones, play-by-play; David Norrie, analyst; and Stacey Dales, sideline reporter.
Two games: Arizona State–USC and Virginia Tech–Miami (Fla.).
Gary Thorne, play-by-play; Andre Ware, analyst; and Todd Harris, sideline reporter.
One game: Texas–Kansas State.
Brad Nessler, play-by-play; Bob Griese and Paul Maguire, analysts; and Erin Andrews, sideline reporter.
One game: California–USC.
Mike Patrick, play-by-play; Todd Blackledge, analyst; and Holly Rowe, sideline reporter (ESPN crew).
One game: Nebraska–Oklahoma (Big 12 Championship Game).

2007
Brent Musburger, play-by-play; Kirk Herbstreit, analyst; Lisa Salters, and Chris Spielman, sideline reporters.
Eleven games: Tennessee–California, USC–Nebraska, Iowa–Wisconsin, USC–Washington, Ohio State–Purdue, Michigan–Illinois, Ohio State–Penn State, Florida State–Boston College, Kansas–Oklahoma State, Missouri–Kansas, and Oklahoma–Missouri (Big 12 Championship Game, with Spielman).
Dan Fouts, play-by-play; Tim Brant, analyst; and Todd Harris, sideline reporter.
Two games: Washington State–USC and Notre Dame–UCLA.
Terry Gannon, play-by-play; David Norrie, analyst; and Jeannine Edwards, sideline reporter.
Two games: Oregon State–USC and USC–California.
Ron Franklin, play-by-play; Ed Cunningham, analyst; and Jack Arute, sideline reporter.
One game: Texas A&M–Oklahoma.
Dave LaMont, play-by-play; Chris Spielman, analyst; and Quint Kessenich, sideline reporter.
One game: Boston College–Maryland.
Brad Nessler, play-by-play; Bob Griese and Paul Maguire, analysts; and Bonnie Bernstein, sideline reporter.
One game: Oklahoma–Texas Tech.

2008
Brent Musburger, play-by-play; Kirk Herbstreit, analyst; and Lisa Salters or Erin Andrews, sideline reporter.
Twelve games: Alabama–Clemson (Chick-fil-A Kickoff Game, with Andrews), Ohio State–USC (with Andrews), Georgia–Arizona State, Illinois–Penn State, Missouri–Texas, Penn State–Ohio State, Texas–Texas Tech, Oklahoma State–Texas Tech, Boston College–Florida State, Texas Tech–Oklahoma, Oklahoma–Oklahoma State, and Missouri–Oklahoma (Big 12 Championship Game).
Ron Franklin, play-by-play; Ed Cunningham, analyst; and Heather Cox or Jack Arute, sideline reporter.
Two games: Michigan State–California (with Cox) and Oklahoma State–Colorado (with Arute).
Sean McDonough, play-by-play; Chris Spielman, analyst; and Rob Stone or Erin Andrews, sideline reporter (ESPN2 crew).
Two games: Virginia Tech–Nebraska (with Andrews) and California–USC (with Stone).
Mike Patrick, play-by-play; Todd Blackledge, analyst; and Holly Rowe, sideline reporter (ESPN crew).
One game: Ohio State–Wisconsin.
Mark Jones, play-by-play; Bob Davie, analyst; and Todd Harris, sideline reporter (ESPN2 crew).
One game: Oregon–USC.

2009
Brent Musburger, play-by-play; Kirk Herbstreit, analyst; and Lisa Salters, sideline reporter.
Twelve games: Alabama–Virginia Tech (Chick-fil-A Kickoff Game), Texas Tech–Texas, Iowa–Penn State, Oklahoma–Miami (Fla.), Michigan–Iowa, Texas–Missouri, USC–Oregon, Connecticut–Cincinnati, Notre Dame–Pittsburgh, Oregon–Arizona, Notre Dame–Stanford, and Texas–Nebraska (Big 12 Championship Game).
Mike Patrick, play-by-play; Craig James, analyst; and Heather Cox, sideline reporter.
Three games: Oregon State–USC, USC–Arizona State, and Texas Tech–Oklahoma State.
Ron Franklin, play-by-play; Ed Cunningham, analyst; and Shelley Smith, sideline reporter.
Three games: USC–California (with Smith), Oklahoma–Nebraska, and Kansas–Texas (with Smith).
Sean McDonough, play-by-play; Matt Millen, analyst; and Holly Rowe, sideline reporter.
Two games: Texas–Oklahoma State and Georgia–Georgia Tech.

2010
Brent Musburger, play-by-play; Kirk Herbstreit, analyst; and Erin Andrews, Heather Cox, or Holly Rowe, sideline reporter.
Ten games: LSU–North Carolina (Chick-fil-A Kickoff Game), Oregon State–Boise State, Stanford–Oregon, Florida State–Miami (Fla.) (with Cox), Oklahoma–Missouri, Oregon–USC, Arizona–Stanford, Nebraska–Texas A&M (with Cox), Oklahoma–Oklahoma State, and Nebraska–Oklahoma (Big 12 Championship Game) (with Rowe).
Mike Patrick, play-by-play; and Craig James, analyst.
Four games: USC–Stanford (with Shelley Smith), Ohio State–Minnesota (with Ray Bentley), Clemson–Florida State (with Jeannine Edwards), and Florida State–Maryland.
Ron Franklin, play-by-play; and Ed Cunningham, analyst.
Three games: Texas–Texas Tech (with Jeannine Edwards), Missouri–Texas Tech, and USC–Arizona (with Shelley Smith).
Sean McDonough, play-by-play; Matt Millen, analyst; and Heather Cox, sideline reporter.
Two games: Notre Dame–Boston College and Oklahoma State–Texas.
Brad Nessler, play-by-play; and Todd Blackledge, analyst.
Two games: Notre Dame–Michigan State (with Holly Rowe) and Notre Dame–USC (with Shelley Smith).
Mark Neely, play-by-play; Mike Bellotti and Brock Huard, analysts.
One game: USC–Oregon State.

2011
Brent Musburger, play-by-play; Kirk Herbstreit, analyst; and Erin Andrews or Lisa Salters, sideline reporter.
Seven games: Oregon–LSU (Advocare Classic), Oklahoma–Florida State, LSU–West Virginia, Nebraska–Wisconsin, Stanford–USC, Kansas State–Oklahoma State (with Salters), and Oregon–Stanford.
Sean McDonough, play-by-play; Matt Millen, analyst; and Heather Cox or Jeannine Edwards, sideline reporter.
 Two games: Ohio State–Nebraska (with Edwards) and Washington–Stanford (with Cox).
Mike Patrick, play-by-play; Craig James, analyst; and Jenn Brown, sideline reporter.
 One game: Clemson–Georgia Tech.
Brad Nessler, play-by-play; Todd Blackledge, analyst; and Holly Rowe, sideline reporter.
 One game: Texas Tech–Oklahoma.
Mark Jones, play-by-play; and Ed Cunningham, analyst.
 One game: Notre Dame–Wake Forest.

2012
Brent Musburger, play-by-play; Kirk Herbstreit, analyst; and Heather Cox, sideline reporter.
Twelve games: Michigan–Alabama (Advocare Classic), Notre Dame–Michigan State, Clemson–Florida State, Wisconsin–Nebraska, Florida State–Miami, Notre Dame–Oklahoma, Oklahoma State–Kansas State, Notre Dame–Boston College, Stanford–Oregon, and Notre Dame–USC.
Brad Nessler, play-by-play; Todd Blackledge, analyst; and Holly Rowe, sideline reporter.
Two games: Nebraska–Ohio State, Texas–Kansas State.
Sean McDonough, play-by-play; Chris Spielman, analyst; and Quint Kessenich, sideline reporter.
One game: Baylor–Texas.

2013
Brent Musburger, play-by-play; Kirk Herbstreit, analyst; and Heather Cox, sideline reporter.
Eleven games: Georgia–Clemson, Notre Dame–Purdue, Kansas State–Texas, Wisconsin–Ohio State, Ohio State–Northwestern, Florida State–Clemson, Miami–Florida State, Notre Dame–Pittsburgh, Stanford–USC, Baylor–Oklahoma State, Duke–Florida State (ACC Championship)
Sean McDonough, play-by-play; Chris Spielman, analyst; and Shannon Spake, sideline reporter.
Two games: Michigan–Connecticut, UCLA–USC.
Brad Nessler, play-by-play; Todd Blackledge, analyst; and Holly Rowe, sideline reporter.
One game: Penn State–Ohio State.

2014
Chris Fowler, play-by-play; Kirk Herbstreit, analyst; Heather Cox, and Tom Rinaldi, sideline reporters.
Nine games: Florida State–Oklahoma State (Advocare Classic), Tennessee–Oklahoma, Clemson–Florida State (with Rinaldi), Notre Dame–Syracuse, Nebraska–Michigan State, Notre Dame–Florida State (with Rinaldi), Ohio State–Michigan State, Florida State–Miami, Florida State–Georgia Tech (ACC Championship)
Brad Nessler, play-by-play; Todd Blackledge, analyst; and Holly Rowe, sideline reporter.
Three games: Ohio State–Penn State,  USC–UCLA,  Oregon-Oregon State
Sean McDonough, play-by-play; Chris Spielman, analyst; and Todd McShay, sideline reporter.
One game: Illinois–Ohio State
Bob Wischusen, play-by-play; Matt Millen, analyst; and Quint Kessenich, sideline reporter.
One game: Oklahoma State–Kansas State

2015
Chris Fowler or Rece Davis, play-by-play; Kirk Herbstreit, analyst; Heather Cox and Tom Rinaldi, sideline reporters.
Eleven games: Wisconsin–Alabama (Advocare Classic), Oregon–Michigan State (with Davis), UCLA–Arizona, Notre Dame–Clemson, Miami–Florida State, Penn State–Ohio State, Ohio State–Rutgers, Notre Dame-Temple, Oklahoma-Baylor, Oklahoma-Oklahoma State (with Rinaldi), North Carolina-Clemson (ACC Championship, with Rinaldi)
Brad Nessler, play-by-play; Todd Blackledge, analyst; and Holly Rowe, sideline reporter.
Two games: Minnesota-Ohio State, TCU-Oklahoma 
Sean McDonough, play-by-play; Chris Spielman, analyst; and Todd McShay, sideline reporter.
One game: Stanford–USC

2016
Chris Fowler or Rece Davis, play-by-play; Kirk Herbstreit, analyst; Samantha Ponder and Tom Rinaldi, sideline reporters, Jerry Punch and Marty Smith pit reporters (Battle at Bristol only)
Thirteen games: USC-Alabama (Advocare Classic), Virginia Tech-Tennessee (Pilot Flying J Battle at Bristol, with Davis, Punch and Smith), Stanford-UCLA, Louisville-Clemson (with Rinaldi), Florida State-Miami, Ohio State-Wisconsin, Ohio State-Penn State, Clemson-Florida State, Nebraska-Ohio State, Michigan-Iowa, Oklahoma-West Virginia, Clemson-Virginia Tech (ACC Championship)
Joe Tessitore, play-by-play; Todd Blackledge, analyst; Holly Rowe, sideline reporter.
Two games: USC-Stanford, Florida-Florida State

2017
 Chris Fowler, play-by-play; Kirk Herbstreit, analyst; Maria Taylor and Tom Rinaldi, sideline reporters
Thirteen games: Florida State–Alabama (Chick-fil-A Kickoff Game, with Rinaldi), Oklahoma–Ohio State, Clemson-Louisville, Penn State-Iowa, Clemson-Virginia Tech (with Rinaldi), Michigan State-Michigan, Michigan-Penn State (with Rinaldi), Georgia Tech-Clemson, Virginia Tech-Miami, Notre Dame–Miami (with Rinaldi), UCLA–USC, Notre Dame–Stanford, Miami-Clemson (ACC Championship, with Rinaldi)
Steve Levy, play-by-play, Brian Griese, analyst; Todd McShay, sideline reporter 
Two games: Utah-USC, Texas Tech-Oklahoma

2018
Chris Fowler, play-by-play; Kirk Herbstreit, analyst; Maria Taylor and Tom Rinaldi, sideline reporters.
Thirteen games: Louisville-Alabama (Camping World Kickoff), Ohio State-TCU (Advocare Showdown), Stanford-Oregon, Ohio State-Penn State (with Rinaldi), Notre Dame-Virginia Tech, Wisconsin-Michigan, Ohio State-Purdue (with Rinaldi), Texas-Oklahoma State, Clemson-Boston College, Cincinnati-UCF, Notre Dame-USC, Clemson-Pitt (ACC Championship)
Sean McDonough, play-by-play; Todd Blackledge, analyst; Holly Rowe, sideline reporter 
One game: Penn State-Pittsburgh
Steve Levy, play-by-play; Brian Griese, analyst; Todd McShay, sideline reporter  
One game: Oklahoma-Texas Tech

2019
Chris Fowler, Rece Davis, Sean McDonough, or Bob Wischusen, play-by-play; Kirk Herbstreit, analyst; Maria Taylor or Molly McGrath, sideline reporter.
Thirteen games: Auburn–Oregon (Advocare Classic), LSU–Texas (with Davis), Clemson–Syracuse (with McDonough), Oklahoma State–Texas, Nebraska–Ohio State, Michigan State–Ohio State, Michigan–Penn State, Michigan–Notre Dame, Memphis–SMU, Clemson–NC State, Baylor–Oklahoma, Arizona State–Oregon, Boise State–Washington (Las Vegas Bowl, with Wischusen and McGrath)
Steve Levy, play-by-play; Brian Griese, analyst; Todd McShay, and Molly McGrath or Maria Taylor, sideline reporters.
Two games: Colorado–Utah, Clemson–Virginia (ACC Championship, with Taylor)
Sean McDonough, play-by-play; Todd Blackledge, analyst; Holly Rowe, sideline reporter 
One game: Iowa–Penn State

2020
Chris Fowler, play-by-play; Kirk Herbstreit, analyst; Maria Taylor, Allison Williams, Molly McGrath, or Holly Rowe, sideline reporters.
Nine games: Miami-Louisville (with Williams), Florida State-Miami (with McGrath), Miami-Clemson (with Williams), Michigan-Minnesota (with Taylor), Ohio State-Penn State (with Taylor), Stanford–Oregon (with Taylor), Wisconsin-Michigan (with Rowe), Oklahoma State–Oklahoma (with Rowe), Clemson-Virginia Tech (with Taylor)
Sean McDonough, play-by-play; Todd Blackledge, analyst; Todd McShay, and Allison Williams or Molly McGrath, sideline reporters.
Three games: Clemson–Wake Forest (with Williams), Oklahoma-Iowa State (with McGrath), North Carolina-Florida State (with McGrath)
Dave Pasch or Joe Tessitore, play-by-play; Greg McElroy, analyst; and Allison Williams or Holly Rowe, sideline reporter
Two games: USC–UCLA (with Pasch and Williams), Tulsa–Cincinnati (AAC Championship, with Tessitore and Rowe)
Beth Mowins, play–by–play; Kirk Morrison, analyst; and Stormy Buonantony, sideline reporter
One game: Utah–Washington

2021
Chris Fowler, play-by-play; Kirk Herbstreit, analyst; Holly Rowe, sideline reporter.
Six games: Georgia-Clemson, Auburn-Penn State, West Virginia-Oklahoma, TCU-Oklahoma, Penn State-Ohio State, Oklahoma-Oklahoma State
Sean McDonough, play-by-play; Todd Blackledge, analyst; and Molly McGrath, sideline reporter.
Four games: Washington-Michigan, Indiana-Penn State, Michigan-Nebraska, Oregon-Utah
Dave Pasch, play-by-play; Dusty Dvoracek, analyst; and Tom Luginbill, sideline reporter.
Two games: Ohio State-Indiana, Notre Dame-Virginia 
Mark Jones, play-by-play; Robert Griffin III, analyst; and Quint Kessenich, sideline reporter.
Two games: Oregon-Washington, Pittsburgh-Wake Forest (ACC Championship)
Joe Tessitore, play-by-play; Greg McElroy, analyst; and Laura Rutledge, sideline reporter.
One game: Utah State-Oregon State (LA Bowl)

2022
Chris Fowler or Rece Davis, play-by-play; Kirk Herbstreit, analyst: Holly Rowe, sideline reporter.
Seven games: Notre Dame–Ohio State, USC–Stanford (with Davis), Wisconsin–Ohio State, NC State–Clemson, Clemson–Florida State, TCU–Texas, Notre Dame-USC
Sean McDonough, play-by-play; Todd Blackledge, analyst; and Molly McGrath, sideline reporter.
Three games: Clemson-Boston College, Michigan State-Michigan, Clemson-North Carolina (ACC Championship) 
Joe Tessitore, play-by-play; Greg McElroy, analyst; and Katie George, sideline reporter.
Two games: Minnesota-Penn State, Florida State-Miami
Mark Jones, play-by-play; Robert Griffin III, analyst; and Quint Kessenich, sideline reporter.
One game: Michigan State–Washington
Dave Pasch, play-by-play; Dusty Dvoracek, analyst; and Tom Luginbill, sideline reporter.
One game: Oklahoma State-Oklahoma
Tom Hart, play-by-play; Brock Osweiler, analyst; and Taylor McGregor, sideline reporter.
One game: SMU–BYU (New Mexico Bowl)

Schedules
All rankings are from that week's AP Poll, and that week's CFP rankings since 2014.

2006 schedule
ABC did not air games on either October 21 or October 28 to avoid competing with the World Series.

2007 schedule
ABC did not air games on either September 8 or October 13 due to broadcasts of NASCAR NEXTEL Cup Series races.

2008 schedule
ABC did not air games on either September 6 or October 11 due to broadcasts of NASCAR Sprint Cup Series races.

2009 schedule
ABC did not air games on either September 12 or October 17 due to broadcasts of NASCAR Sprint Cup Series races.

2010 schedule
ABC did not air games on either September 11 or October 16 due to broadcasts of NASCAR Sprint Cup Series races.

2011 schedule
Notes:
 1) ABC did not air games on either September 10 or October 15 due to broadcasts of NASCAR Sprint Cup Series races.
 2) Many of the markets scheduled to receive the Texas Tech–Oklahoma game on October 22 instead saw Washington–Stanford, as a thunderstorm delayed the start of the game, and most affiliates stuck with the latter even after the storm cleared. The Texas Tech–Oklahoma game was seen on ESPN2 after the Alabama-Tennessee game, expect in Big 12 markets, where it aired on ABC.

2012 schedule
ABC did not air Games on either September 8 or October 13 due to broadcasts of NASCAR Sprint Cup Series races.

2013 schedule
ABC did not air Games on either September 7 or October 12 due to broadcasts of NASCAR Sprint Cup Series races.

2014 schedule
ABC did not air games on either September 6 or October 11 due to broadcasts of NASCAR Sprint Cup Series races.

2015 schedule

2016 schedule

2017 schedule

2018 schedule

2019 schedule

2020 schedule

2021 schedule

2022 schedule

Standings

Nielsen ratings

Top 10 Regular Season Games

Seasonal
Seasonal rankings (based on average total viewers per episode) of Saturday Night Football on ABC.

Theme music
At the time the Saturday night package began in 2006, ABC Sports was integrated with ESPN, resulting in ESPN production concepts being applied to ABC-televised sports events. As a result, during the 2006 and 2007 seasons, the theme music used for the ESPN College Football and College GameDay broadcasts was used on ABC's college football telecasts – including Saturday Night Football – with the exception in both years being the Rose Bowl, during which it used the bowl game version of the network's 1998-2005 sports theme (a cut that had traditionally been used in broadcast intros). Saturday Night Football games began using the bowl version of the 1998-2005 theme as well in 2008, continuing through the 2010 BCS National Championship Game.

The intro theme was updated in 2011, with the main theme music being changed to a different cut of the 1998-2005 bowl game theme (one that had usually been used during studio shows in the past). Bowl Championship Series games aired on ESPN during this period were produced identically to Saturday Night Football productions, and used this same theme music arrangement.

In 2012, the theme for all college football telecasts on both ESPN and ABC was changed to a heavily updated version of yet another one of ABC's 1998-2005 themes (this one had usually been used for intro teasers in the past). However, unlike previous SNF themes, this theme was a completely new recording, using the tune of the 1998-2005 song as the base.

In 2015, ABC began using the same theme used by all ESPN college football productions since the 2014-15 New Years' Six bowl games.

See also
 College Football Final
 College Football Scoreboard
 College GameDay
 ESPN College Football on ABC
 ESPN College Football Thursday Primetime
 ESPN College Football Saturday Primetime
 ESPN2 College Football Saturday Primetime

References

External links
 
 
 
Weekly listings for the 2006 through 2010 college football seasons
 

2006 American television series debuts
2010s American television series
2020s American television series
ABC Sports
American Broadcasting Company original programming
College football television series
English-language television shows
Saturday mass media